The Frog Bayou Bridge is a historic bridge in Crawford County, Arkansas, just south of Mountainburg. It is a single-span steel Parker through truss, which formerly carried Arkansas Highway 282 across Frog Bayou, a tributary of the Arkansas River. The bridge is now closed to traffic, and is located at the southern end of Silver Bridge Road. The northern approach to the bridge also includes a stone and concrete pier. The bridge was built in 1942.

The bridge was listed on the National Register of Historic Places in 1995.

See also
List of bridges documented by the Historic American Engineering Record in Arkansas
List of bridges on the National Register of Historic Places in Arkansas
National Register of Historic Places listings in Crawford County, Arkansas

References

External links

Road bridges on the National Register of Historic Places in Arkansas
Bridges completed in 1942
1942 establishments in Arkansas
Historic American Engineering Record in Arkansas
National Register of Historic Places in Crawford County, Arkansas
Steel bridges in the United States
Parker truss bridges in the United States
Transportation in Crawford County, Arkansas